The 2002 Rallye Sanremo (formally the 44th Rallye Sanremo - Rallye d'Italia) was the eleventh round of the 2002 World Rally Championship. The race was held over three days between 20 September and 22 September 2002, and was won by Peugeot's Gilles Panizzi, his 6th win in the World Rally Championship.

Background

Entry list

Itinerary
All dates and times are CEST (UTC+2).

Results

Overall

World Rally Cars

Classification

Special stages

Championship standings

Junior World Rally Championship

Classification

Special stages

Championship standings

References

External links 
 Official website of the World Rally Championship

Rallye Sanremo
Rallye Sanremo